Edgewood is a home rule–class city in Kenton County, Kentucky, United States. The population was 8,575 at the 2010 census, down from 9,400 in 2000. It was named for an early homestead in Walker Estates.

Edgewood was incorporated by act of the state assembly on November 15, 1948. Part of what was early Edgewood was called South Ft Mitchell. In 1968, two nearby cities merged  Summit Hills Heights (inc. 1962) and St. Pius Heights (inc. 1965). The new city government began operation on January 1, 1969.

Geography
Edgewood is located in north-central Kenton County at  (39.005153, −84.565780). It is bordered to the north by Crestview Hills, to the northeast by Fort Wright, to the east by Covington, and to the south and west by Erlanger. The Dixie Highway (here bearing U.S. Routes 25, 42, and 127) runs through the northwestern end of the city, leading northeast  to the center of Covington and southwest  to Florence. Interstate 275, the beltway around Cincinnati, passes just north of the Edgewood city limits, with access from Exit 83 (the Dixie Highway).

Demographics
As of the census of 2000, there were 9,400 people, 3,099 households, and 2,693 families residing in the city. The racial makeup of the city is 97.74% White, 1.23% African American, 0.19% Native American, 0.08% Asian, 0.03% Pacific Islander, 0.19% from other races, and 0.55% from two or more races. 0.73% of the population are Hispanic or Latino of any race.

There were 3,099 households, out of which 44.4% had children under the age of 18 living with them, 78.4% were married couples living together, 6.2% had a female householder with no husband present, and 13.1% were non-families. Of all households, 11.1% were made up of individuals, and 4.5% had someone living alone who was 65 years of age or older. The average household size was 3.03 and the average family size was 3.29.

In the city, the population was spread out, with 29.1% under the age of 18, 7.9% from 18 to 24, 26.4% from 25 to 44, 27.9% from 45 to 64, and 8.7% who were 65 years of age or older. The median age was 38 years. For every 100 females, there were 97.4 males. For every 100 females age 18 and over, there were 94.6 males.

The median income for a household in the city was $76,218, and the median income for a family was $80,578. Males had a median income of $52,739 versus $34,327 for females. The per capita income for the city was $29,962. About 0.7% of families and 1.5% of the population were below the poverty line, including 2.0% of those under age 18 and 0.9% of those age 65 or over.

Points of interest
 Presidents Park: A  park located at 283 Dudley Road. The park has baseball fields, hiking trails and basketball courts.
 St. Elizabeth Hospital: A full-service hospital located at 1 Medical Village Drive. St. E has been rated one of the top 50 hospitals in the U.S. from 2006 to 2011 by HealthGrades.
 Freedom Park: A second park that has volleyball, baseball, soccer, along with an open field. It is located by the intersection of Dudley Road and Thomas More Parkway.

Notable people
 Tom Browning, the only Cincinnati Reds pitcher to pitch a perfect game; formerly lived in Edgewood
 Luke Maile, former catcher for the Toronto Blue Jays
 Brian Pillman Jr., professional wrestler

References

External links
Official website

Cities in Kenton County, Kentucky
Cities in Kentucky